Rovinjsko Selo  is a village in Croatia. It is connected by the D303 highway.

References

Populated places in Istria County